Anti-environmentalism is a movement that favors loose environmental regulation in favor of economic benefits and opposes strict environmental regulation aimed at preserving nature and the planet. Anti-environmentalists seek to persuade the public that environmental policy impacts society negatively. The movement's goals include to counter the effects of environmental ideology and movements, to diminish public concern about the environment and to persuade politicians against increasing environmental regulations.

Concern for economic growth is the source of anti-environmentalist beliefs. Anti-environmentalists weigh the benefits to the business sector of the economy more heavily than the consequences of lack of regulation has to the environment and inhabitants. 

Anti-environmentalists believe that humans do not need to interfere with the Earth's natural processes and therefore environmental regulation is unnecessary. Some anti-environmentalists argue that the Earth's system is not as fragile as environmentalists maintain. They believe Earth will continue to maintain and restore itself through natural cycles as it did long before humans arrived and will continue to maintain itself long after humans are gone.

History
Anti-environmentalism is a response to the environmentally conscious movements of the late 20th and early 21st century. Anti-environmentalists generally seek to lower the amount of governmental regulations to do with both the greener standard of operations and public awareness of conservation for the land and sea, exemplified by the late 1960s and early 1970s. With this new-found public concern, large businesses lost the general public's trust and were viewed as environmentally detrimental institutions. This ultimately resulted in the creation of legislation and contracts based upon these environmental issues.

Canada 
Concern about the impacts of human activity on the environment in Canada started in the 1960s with the concern of pollution.  Throughout the 1960s, more emphasis was put on nature conservation, as the natural environment started to be seen not only as scenic, but important to human survival. Public concern for the environment turned into action with the development of activist groups such as Greenpeace. This concern was later reflected in decisions made by the Canadian government, as was seen with Canada ratifying the Kyoto Protocol in 2002 under the leadership of Jean Chrétien of the Liberal Party.  Critics of the environmental movements described Greenpeace as a radical group, displaying an act of "domestic extremism".

China 
During the Maoist period in China (1949-1976), Maoism was a popular political theory which guided communism in China and believed in using and destroying nature for economic and industrial growth. Maoism emphasized the importance of industrial growth and saw the destruction of the environment for the extraction of resources as essential for the benefit of Chinese people and the economy. Eventually with their growing industrial economy, China began to be a large producer of carbon emissions globally, thus China began to take environmental action in 1990 and eventually enacted the Implementation of a Renewable Energy Law in 2005. The Chinese government has since transitioned to implement policy to reduce the effects of carbon emissions. China also believes they must exclude businesses from environmentalism because most are opposed to any environmental action.

Mexico 
From the 1980s, Mexico experienced rampant deforestation to create room for pastures. Tropical forests covered 50% of the state of Tabasco in 1940, which then was reduced to 10% in the late 1980s.  The result of this has been mass soil erosion nationwide. By 1985, 17% of Mexico's land was classified as totally eroded, while almost 50% of land was classified as experiencing an accelerated erosion, or signs of impending erosion.  The coastline of Mexico experiences other problems, such as the exploitation of petrol as there are relaxed regulations concerning petrol.  In 1992, this resulted in 1,000 barrels of gasoline leaking into municipal sewer systems in Guadalajara, where the gases and chemicals produced an explosion killing almost 200 people.  Following this event, in 1994, President Bill Clinton issued executive orders demanding that the North American Agreement on Environmental Cooperation and the Agreement Between the Government of the United States of America and the Government of the United Mexican States Concerning the Establishment of a Border Environment Cooperation Commission be enforced so that it aligns with American environmental policy.

One study conducted in the mid-1980s of twelve urban areas around the world concluded that residents of Mexico City had the highest levels of cadmium in their blood.  The concentration of pollutants was impacting surrounding ecosystems, as well as residents in the area. These impacts included birth defects and high levels of gastrointestinal disease.  Also in the 1980s, the Mexican government implemented various anti-pollution policies in Mexico City. These policies included vehicle emission inspections, introducing unleaded gasoline, and the installation of converters on vehicles to help reduce pollution created by buses and trucks.  Another study in Mexico determined that five million tons of contaminants were released into the atmosphere each year; ten times more than in the previous decade. Vehicles and industrial plants were found to be the main contributors of contaminants into the atmosphere.  As well, faecal matter becomes airborne in Mexico during the winter months, resulting in residents being diagnosed with a variety of respiratory illnesses.

United States

During his time as President of the United States, Bill Clinton made progress towards environmentalism and sustainability.  Throughout the 1990s, Clinton signed various executive orders committing to the preservation of many facets of the environment including animals, forests and wetlands.  In 1993, Clinton and Gore hosted the Forest Conference which was considered to be the beginning of developing a comprehensive, long term policy in which workers, businesses and communities dependent on timber sales would be supported.  In the same year, Clinton issued executive orders for federal agencies to increase the use of alternative-fueled vehicles and reduce the use of materials which deplete the ozone.  In addition, Clinton spearheaded an environmental justice movement, ensuring that low-income citizens and minorities did not disproportionately feel the impacts of industrial pollution, and minimizing the hazards associated with the construction of pipelines.

Clinton's successor, President George W. Bush stated in his campaign platform that he would "ensure that the federal government, which is the country's largest polluter, complies with all environmental laws" and that the United States would even exceed the set standards.  Though once elected, Bush verged from what he had promised during his campaign, and instead reversed Clinton administration initiatives on drinking water, and advocated for oil exploration in protected regions.  Bush's administration also moved forward in withdrawing its support of the Kyoto Protocol, a worldwide global warming agreement created in 1997.  Bush stated that he would work with allies to the United States to reduce greenhouse gases, but would not carry out a plan that would "harm the economy" and "hurt American workers".

Political perspectives 

Environmental policy is criticized by some politicians for its impact on businesses. Some conservative and neo-liberal groups want to develop and maintain industry and capitalism through diminution of environmental policy. Anti-environmental politicians seek to reduce governmental regulation because businesses are often criticized by environmentalists for having negative impacts on the environment, so they see environmental policy as governmental control of businesses. Some common arguments are that economic growth justifies environmental harm and that employment could be diminished by environmental policy.

Canada 
 Stephen Harper: Stephen Harper criticized Canada's prior environmental policy for having high restrictions on industry, as Harper sought to industrialize. He wanted to ensure that industries could have better access to natural resources with the goal of increasing Canada's Economy. In May 2011, Harper and the Conservative Party of Canada won the Canadian federal election with a majority government, which allowed them to make significant changes to Canada's environmental policy. A bill passed May 2012 titled the "Jobs, Growth and Long-term Prosperity Act." The Harper government focused more economic growth, such as the oil industry in Alberta. Northern Alberta has oil in their tar sands and extracting it was seen by environmentalists as destruction to the environment and a source of Greenhouse gas emissions. The Harper government focused on expanding the economy over the interests of environmentalists.  Also environmental groups were also deemed "extremists" by the Harper Government and listed them under the anti-terrorism strategy as a national security threat.

Major conflicts

Alberta oil sands in Canada 
The Alberta oil sands has also been a point of contention between environmentalists and anti-environmentalists. Anti-environmentalists maintain that the oil sands have improved Canada's relations with the United States as Canada is their number one foreign supplier of oil.

As well, the oil sands have brought a secure source of energy to Canada, as well as tremendous economic gains for Alberta.  There are some environmental efforts in place to mitigate the effects that the mining involved in operating the oil sands mine has on animal species, though environmentalist groups are not satisfied. Environmentalist groups such as Greenpeace are concerned with the environmental, social and health impacts of mining the oil sands, particularly on First Nations communities in Alberta.

Standing Rock in the United States 
The source of this conflict is that on January 25, 2016, Dakota Access announced that it received permit approval to move forward with the construction of a four-state crude oil pipeline which would transport 470,000 barrels of oil per day from North Dakota to Illinois.  Anti-environmentalists defended the construction of the Pipeline as it would create thousands of jobs, make the United States more energy independent and create a more cost-effective method of transporting oil to major refining markets.  The Standing Rock Sioux Tribe took issue with this as the pipeline would run through their communities, tainting their sacred land as well as contaminating their water supply.  What followed in the next ten months was a response from Sioux communities, protestors and environmentalist groups in the form of peaceful protests in which over 400 arrests were made by local law enforcement. 26 Environmentalist groups responded to the event with an open letter condemning the actions of the North American banks who helped fund the pipeline, and encouraged them to stop any future payments contributing to it.

Anti-Mining Mobilization in Peru

In the early 1990s, there was an increase in large-scale mining and hydrocarbon operations in Peru. This development created disputes within rural communities. The main cause of conflict involved the struggle over land and natural resources. Individuals tended to participate in illegal operations that oftentimes caused environmental consequences. In May 2009, Defensoria del Pueblo from the Ombudsman's Office made a publication which highlighted 268 social conflicts in Peru. In June of the same year, a protest against the García administration's concession on the rights of petroleum exploration on indigenous land created a conflict costing the lives of 24 police officers and 10 civilians. In April 2010, Madre de Dios, the Amazonian department witnessed a protest which resulted in 6 informal gold miners being shot and killed. Within the same month, a conflict concerning roughly 6,000 informal protectors and 1,000 police officers occurred in the southern department of Aregupa. Approximately 1,000 protestors were killed. A later report published by the Ombudsman's Office in June 2010 recorded 250 conflicts. Out of these, 18 were developing in the department of the northern highland of Cajamarea and another 13 concerned mineral extraction.

Resistance to Coal Power Plant in Kenya

In June 2018, Kenyan protestors marched the streets in demand that their President Uhuru Kenyatta to stop the building process of a coal power plant in their country. Officials state that the power plant will satisfy Kenya's rising demand for electric power. One of the protest's organizers Khalid Hussein of the national human rights group made a statement that coal is poison to both the people and the environment and citizens are demanding for the plant to not be installed. The coal power plant is being constructed by a Chinese company, China Power Global. Critics believe that this project will pollute the environment and damage the marine ecosystem. This can extend to conflicts due to climate change-induced migration. In 2007, the Christian Aid Charity warned that towards the end of the 21st century 184 million Africans could die from the result of climate change alone, and that roughly one billion will be forced to leave their homes as effects of climate change worsen.

The Czech Republic and the Highway by-pass project

In 1991, Plzen Czech Republic experienced immense air pollution that citizens felt was the source of their health problems. The government decided they needed to build a new highway so the traffic could no longer create pollution in the city. Two different plans were created, one being the K variant which put the highway south of the city, and the S variant which would go through protected land, and would have negative impacts on rural areas as opposed to the city. This event began environmental movements in the Czech Republic that protested the S variant. In previous years, Czechoslovakia had been focused on the Soviet model of industrial expansion which lacked environmental regulation. This had effects on the environment, such as low-grade coal used in houses and by industries as well as lead gasoline used in automobiles. In the 1980's environmental activists protested the governments lack of environmental regulation. Political campaigns thereafter became increasingly anti-environmental through media outlets and newspaper coverage. Media coverage shared statements such as "Environmentalists believe that bugs are more important than people" and "Beware of environmentalists – they are extremists." These statements created fear of environmental causes in the population.

Global relations 
Since the early 1990s, key issues across the world regarding how nations should address the concept of climate change have created several tensions. As a result, from these tensions, global relations (specifically between developed and developing nations) have diminished in quality. For example, the Kyoto and Copenhagen Conferences in the late 2000s brought up issues around nuclear power energy use in Japan, and the nuclear radiation detected on the coast of other countries of the Pacific. Eventually, the argument was settled between Japan and its oppositional forces of the United Nations, led by key large nations of the West such as the United States, in the Copenhagen Accord. The Copenhagen Accord itself hosts large controversy, headed by promises of both developed and developing nations to mitigate advocations for action against climate change. In other words, in an attempt to create a regime that complements the United Nation's core beliefs that often correlate to Western society's beliefs, attitudes of past imperialism were implemented on a global scale. An earlier occurrence reflects the same concept, when Indonesia experienced widespread drought between the years 1993 and 1997. During this time period, rice, Indonesia's staple crop and food source, experienced major reductions in its production, causing riots resulting from a dramatic increase in price of rice and political instability.

China played a key part during this period, being that the country made settlements on subsidies for rice, as China experienced an abundance of rice yield during the same period. This furthered Indonesia's debt to China, cancelling out any progress made by the two nations during the Settlement of Indonesia's Debt Obligation to China conference of 1990. China, which is a developing nation  is the world's second largest economy. China's overall economy has grown 10% annually for a decade. China's overall sentiment in the past of focusing on development now and later caring about the environment has allowed many impoverished Chinese to move out of poverty. Pro-Environmental policies criticize China's economic development as causing "air, water and soil pollution". Chinese industry utilizes the cheapest methods of production and labor to advance their economy which in turn impacts the environment and environmental policy can impose restriction's on the advancement of china's economy and industry.

The Paris Agreement was an international legal agreement implemented December 2015, for states to take collective action against climate change by working towards decreasing the globe's average temperature and make countries financing consistent with that goal.  The United States - under the Obama Administration - agreed upon the Paris Agreement. When Donald Trump was elected president of the United States, he pulled out of the agreement due to his major concern for its restrictions on building industry in the United States despite the pressures from allies and lobbying groups.

Anti-environmentalism in the 21st century

Canada 
In 2014, Environment Canada released its annual emissions trends report, which showed that Canada was not going to meet emission reduction targets as was promised in 2009. In fact, Canada is on track to increase its emissions up until 2020. Harper's government, while originally committed to reducing emissions, also disapproved of limiting oil and gas emissions as the price of oil rose higher.

This was consistent with Harper's decision to withdraw Canada from the Kyoto Protocol in 2011.  The main reason given for this by Harper was that Canada was not having success in meeting the protocol's targets.  In the following years, Harper's administration made it difficult for environmental groups to operate in Canada. Environmental charities experienced frequent audits by the federal government which resulted in less productivity and being at risk of losing their charitable status.  In addition; scientific institutions were eliminated, or were faced with obstacles such as reduced government funding, and rules put into place which made it increasingly difficult for government scientists to discuss their work with media outlets.  Scientific positions including the National Science Advisor who is the point-person between the scientific community and the government, were phased out in 2008.  Harper also repealed a significant environmental policy which had previously been in place; the Canadian Environmental Assessment Act. Later, a new version of the act was created, which critics argue allows the government to select which projects are assessed for their ecological impact and which are not. In 2015, with the election of Justin Trudeau, the environment became one of Canada's main concerns, with Trudeau eventually signing the Paris Agreement in 2016.

United States 
Former President Barack Obama promised to make the United States more environmentally conscious, and implemented the Clean Power Plan, invested significantly in clean energy, and improved standards for fuel economy of vehicles; this reduced pollution and was also economical.  Obama also made a joint agreement with China to reduce the emissions of both countries, and to reduce emissions in the United States by 27% by 2025.  The current state of environmental affairs in the United States has changed drastically once again with the new Donald Trump administration. Trump has been open about his plans to alter or withdraw entirely from many climate change and environmental agreements the United States is currently involved in, such as the Paris Agreement.  As this agreement is voluntary, the United States would face no penalty if they declined to participate. However, as the United States is the second largest emitter of carbon after China, their lack of participation in the agreement would greatly impact global efforts to reduce carbon emissions. While in 1999, President Bill Clinton announced that the Environmental Protection Agency (EPA) would enforce the toughest standards to date, Trump's administration recently instructed the Environmental Protection Agency to remove the climate change page from its website.  EPA employees have stated that if the page is taken down, years of research on global warming will be gone, as well as detailed data on emissions and links to scientific global warming research. On June 1, 2017, Trump announced that the U.S. would cease all participation in the Paris Agreement on climate change mitigation. Trump stated that "The Paris accord will undermine (the U.S.) economy," and "puts (the U.S.) at a permanent disadvantage."

Mexico 
In Mexico, the economy and population are putting a strain on the environment which has led to increased pollution and natural resources being depleted.  Mexico has implemented an environmental, legal and institutional framework to minimize their negative impact on the environment, and it is now commonplace for sustainable development to be incorporated into policy-making.  This has resulted in improvements in air quality in urban areas, where previously many more individuals were seeing the negative impacts of pollution on their health.  As well, water management has become more decentralized, which has assisted municipalities in developing their own water and waste water infrastructure.  This has also resulted in safer drinking water for residents of Mexico.

However, there are challenges that persist for Mexico in trying to become more sustainable. One of these challenges is that policy-making needs to be accompanied by capacity building within communities to be able to put policy into practice.  Deforestation is also still rampant in Mexico, occurring at one of the highest rates in the world.  The OECD recommends strengthening the implementation of legislation concerning nature conservation and reducing pollution using inspections. OECD also recommends increasing the funding Mexico receives from private, public and international sources so that infrastructure, mainly concerning waste water, can be more effectively implemented.  Investment in water infrastructure makes up approximately 50% of what Mexico requires, as only one quarter of urban waste water is treated.

A recent collaborative development between all three North American countries is that of the North American Climate, Energy, and Environment Partnership.  The partnership was announced by Justin Trudeau, President Barack Obama, and President Enrique Peña Nieto on June 29, 2016, at the North American Leaders Summit in Ottawa, Canada. The central pillars to this partnership include; advancing clean and secure energy; reducing climate pollutants; promoting clean and efficient transportation; protecting nature and advancing science and showing global leadership in addressing climate change.

China 
In China, the city of Maoming became the focus of an environmental dispute in 2014, relating to the municipal government-sponsored Para-Xylene (PX) industry - a chemical used in manufacturing plastics, such as those in water bottles and polyesters. The industry has been promoted in Maoming for its economic benefits due to the jobs provided by the factories. Despite the industry's economic benefits, citizens organized PX protest in 2014 as there was increasing concern for the chemical's environmental and health risks to the citizens of the city. To counteract the environmentalist social movement, the government took action by creating an agreement that all civilians must sign stating they will not engage in protests or speak of the industry negatively, which high school students had to sign in order to graduate, as well as implementing an education campaign by providing lectures to the citizens on PX project.

Poland 
In Poland, various methods of mosquito controlling through the use of chemicals have been in practice since World War II. The motive originally was to aid in the elimination of potential carriers of diseases such as malaria, tularemia, and encephalitis, which were creating epidemic outbreaks. Today, the same method of elimination is being used in order to diminish the mosquito population in major tourist areas throughout Poland. Biocides are commonly used and regulated through municipality staff and officers of city councils. As well, several product's active ingredients, such as Cybermethrin, Ecofenprox, Deltamethrin, and Bendiocarb, type of use varies on the place of application. Typical warning labels caution negative impacts of these products towards natural water and bees are accompanied by another warning label stating "dangerous for the environment." The current expectations towards pest control companies in Poland are that there is a need for environmental consideration through scientific studies. These expectations do not include areas that have a city permit to use products containing biocides.

Brazil 
Increased deforestation in the Amazon rainforest has led to fires in areas where deforestation has increased.

See also 
 Climate change denial
 Criticism of environmentalism
 Environmental skepticism
 Fossil fuels lobby
 Wise use movement
 Rolling coal

References

Further reading

 online 

 Abraham, J. (2016, November 2). Barack Obama is the First Climate President. Retrieved March 20, 2017, from https://www.theguardian.com/environment/climate-consensus-97-per-cent/2016/nov/02/barack-obama-is-the-first-climate-president
 Baggini, J. (2012). The Big Questions: Ethics. London: Quercus Editions Ltd.
 Beder, S. (2001). Anti-Environmentalism/ Green Backlash. International Encyclopedia of  Environmental Politics. Retrieved March 20, 2017 IEEP
 Bush and the Environment. (2001, March 29). Retrieved March 20, 2017, from https://www.pbs.org/newshour/bb/environment-jan-june01-bushenv_3-29/
 
 Environmental Actions by President Clinton and Vice President Gore. (n.d.). Retrieved March 20, 2017, from https://clinton4.nara.gov/CEQ/earthday/ch13.html
 George W. Bush for President Official Site: Issues. (2016, April 5). Retrieved March 20, 2017, from https://web.archive.org/web/20001109011500/http://georgewbush.com/issues/index.html
 Hummel, Monte (July 18, 2016) Environmental and Conservation Movements.  CE at The Canadian Encyclopedia
 North American Climate, Clean Energy, and Environment Partnership Action Plan. (2016, June 29) Retrieved April 4, 2017, from https://obamawhitehouse.archives.gov/the-press-office/2016/06/29/north-american-climate-clean-energy-and-environment-partnership-action
 OECD. (2003, October 30). OECD Praises Mexico's Environmental Policies but Encourages Better Enforcement and Funding. Retrieved March 20, 2017, from http://www.oecd.org/mexico/oecdpraisesmexicosenvironmentalpoliciesbutencouragesbetterenforcementandfunding.htm
Stop Tar Sands Expansion. (n.d.). Retrieved March 20, 2017, from http://www.greenpeace.org/canada/en/campaigns/Energy/tarsands/
 Tabuchi, H. (2016, November 7).  Environmentalists Target Bankers Behind Pipeline. Retrieved March 20, 2017, from https://www.nytimes.com/2016/11/08/business/energy-environment/environmentalists-blast-bankers-behind-dakota-pipeline.html
 Terry, A. (2009, August 31). Pros and Cons: Alberta Oil Sands. Retrieved March 20, 2017, from http://globalnews.ca/news/66591/pros-and-cons-alberta-oil-sands/
 Thorbecke, C. (2017, October 28). Timeline of the Dakota Access Pipeline Protests. Retrieved March 20, 2017, from https://abcnews.go.com/US/timeline-dakota-access-pipeline-protests/story?id=43131355
 U.S. Library of Congress. (n.d.). Mexico: Environmental Conditions. Retrieved March 20, 2017, from http://countrystudies.us/mexico/51.htm
 Volcovici, V. (2017, January 24). Donald Trump's Administration Orders EPA to Pull Climate Change Page Off Website. Retrieved March 20, 2017, from http://globalnews.ca/news/3203689/trump-epa-climate-change/
 Wingrove, J. (2014, December 31). Support for Harper's Environmental Record Increasing, Poll Shows. Retrieved March 20, 2017, from https://www.theglobeandmail.com/news/politics/support-for-harpers-environmental-record-increasing-poll-shows/article22205337/
 Worland, J. (2016, November 9). Climate Change Policy Will Suffer With Donald Trump. Retrieved March 20, 2017, from http://time.com/4564224/donald-trump-climate-change/

 Print

 Ehrlich, Paul R.; Ehrlich, Anne H. (1996). Betrayal of Science and Reason. Island Press. pp. 11–23.
 Shapiro, Judith (2001). Mao's War Against Nature. Cambridge University Press. pp. 1–19.
 Gilley, Bruce (March 2012). "Authoritarian environmentalism and China's response to Climate Change". Environmental Politics. 21: 287–307.
 Doyle, Timothy; McEachern, Doug (2008). Environment and Politics: Third Edition. Abingdon, Oxon: Routledge. 
 MacNeil, Robert (19 November 2013). "Canadian environmental policy under Conservative majority rule". Environmental Politics. Volume 23: 174–178 – via Taylor and Francis Online.
 Biro, Andrew (March 2010).Environmental prospects in Canada. Environmental Politics. Volume 19: 303–309 – via Taylor and Francis Online
 Bronkhorst Salomé Van Jaarveld & Bob Urmilla (2010). Environmental Conflicts. Accord
 Plecash, Chris (May 4, 2012). "Tories Accused of being 'one of most anti-environmental governments in the world'". The Hill Times. Retrieved 31 March 2019.
 Mckay, John (March 16, 2015). "Environment Canada, agencies lapse $1-billion in spending on Conservatives' watch". The Hill Times. Retrieved 31 March 2019.
 Horowitz, Cara A. (August 2016). "Paris Agreement". International Legal Materials. Volume 55: 750–755 – via Cambridge University Press.
 Mohan Vipin (2017). Death Sentence for Mother Nature. Economic & Political Weekly. Volume 23. pp. 8
 Shriver, Thomas E.; Adams, Alison E.; Cable, Sherry (March 2013). "Discursive Obstruction and Elite Opposition to Environmental Activism in the Czech Republic". Social Forces. Volume 91 – via Project MUSE. 
 Taylor Lewis (2011). Environmentalism and Social Protest: The Contemporary Anti-mining Mobilization in the Province of San Marcos and the Condebamba Valley, Peru. Journal of Agrarian Change. 
 Yusuf Mohammed (2018).Kenyan Protesters March Against Coal Plant. VOA. 
 Kythreotis, A. Progress in global climate change politics? Reasserting national state territoriality in a 'post-political' world. Progress in Human Geography, 36(4), 457-474

Environmental skepticism
Political ideologies
Social philosophy